Lee Luscombe (born 16 July 1971) is an English former professional footballer who played in the Football League, as a forward.

Born in Guernsey, he started his youth career with Vale Recreation before joining Southampton as a trainee. After a couple of years, he left Southampton and returned to his home island for a short period. He then returned to the UK and signed for Brentford along with fellow Guernsey player Grant Chalmers. After playing 42 games over a two-year period he moved onto Millwall and then a short loan spell at Sittingbourne. His spell in the UK came to an end after 8 games with Doncaster Rovers. He then returned to his home island of Guernsey and played locally for a while. He later had spells as a goalkeeping coach at Warrington Town and Runcorn Linnets.

References

External links
Player Stats at Doncaster Rovers

1971 births
Living people
English footballers
Guernsey footballers
Association football forwards
Vale Recreation F.C. players
Millwall F.C. players
Brentford F.C. players
Southampton F.C. players
Sittingbourne F.C. players
Doncaster Rovers F.C. players
English Football League players